Refresh is the third extended play by South Korean girl group CLC. It released on February 29, 2016. It was CLC's first release as a seven-member group. "High Heels" was released as the lead single of the EP.

Release
CLC announced their comeback with two additional members that were revealed to be Elkie, and Produce 101 contestant, Kwon Eun-bin. However, due to Eunbin's appearance in Produce 101, she was not able to join CLC's promotions on music shows or broadcast. Eunbin's parts in the music video were also deleted and she postponed her activities with CLC until she was eliminated from Produce 101. CLC released a short version of their promotional single, "High Heels" on February 29, 2016. The full version of the music video was uploaded on March 20.

CLC began promoting as a 6-member group on Mnet's M Countdown on March 3.

Track listing

Charts

Release history

References

External links

2016 EPs
Cube Entertainment EPs
CLC (group) EPs
Korean-language EPs
Dance-pop EPs